Cornel Orza (born 9 January 1916) was a Romanian footballer who played as a striker.

International career
Cornel Orza made seven appearances at international level for Romania, scoring in his debut against Germany which ended with a 1–4 loss.

Honours
Universitatea Cluj
Cupa României runner-up: 1933–34
Venus București
Divizia A: 1938–39, 1939–40
Cupa României runner-up: 1939–40

Notes

References

External links
Cornel Orza at Labtof.ro

1916 births
Romanian footballers
Romania international footballers
Association football forwards
Liga I players
CA Oradea players
FC Universitatea Cluj players
Venus București players
Year of death missing